This is a list of books in the English language which deal with Albania and its geography, history, inhabitants, culture, biota, etc.

Al-Halwaji, ‘Abd Al-Sattar and Habib Allah ‘Azimi – Catalogue of Islamic Manuscripts in the National Library of Albania, Tirana/Fihris makhtutat al-Islamiya bi Maktabat al-wataniya al-Albaniya fi Tirana.
Almagia, Roberto - Albania.
Barjaba, Kosta – Albania’s Democratic Elections, 1991-1997: Analyses, Documents and Data. 
Bethell, Nicholas - Betrayed. 
Biberaj, Elez – Albania, A Socialist Maverick.
Biberaj, Elez – Albania and China: A Study of an Unequal Alliance. 
Brewer, Bob – My Albania: Ground Zero.
Destani, Petjullah and Robert Elsie, eds. - Edward Lear in Albania: Journals of a Landscape Painter in the Balkans. 
Doja, Albert. 2000. "The politics of religion in the reconstruction of identities: the Albanian situation." Critique of Anthropology 20 (4): 421-438. doi=10.1177/0308275X0002000404.
Doja, Albert. 2010. "Fertility trends, marriage patterns and savant typologies in Albanian context." Journal of Family History 35 (4): 346-367. doi=10.1177/0363199010381045.
Doja, Albert. 2012. "The politics of religious dualism: Naim Frashëri and his elective affinity to religion in the course of 19th-century Albanian activism." Social Compass: International Review of Sociology of Religion 60 (1): 115-133. doi=10.1177/0037768612471770.
Doja, Albert. 2015. "From the native point of view: An insider/outsider perspective on folkloric archaism and modern anthropology in Albania." History of the Human Sciences 28 (4): 44-75. doi=10.1177/0952695115594099.
Durham, M. Edith - High Albania.
Elsie, Robert - Historical Dictionary of Albania. 
The Films of the Third International Human Rights Film Festival Albania (HRFFA), 2008.
Fischer, Bernd J. – Albania at War, 1939-1943.
Freedman, Robert Owen – Economic Warfare in the Communist Bloc: A Study of Soviet Economic Pressure Against Yugoslavia, Albania, and Communist China.
Gardiner, Leslie – The Eagle Spreads His Claws: A History of the Corfu Channel Dispute and of Albania’s Relations with the West, 1945-1965. 
Gawrych, George W. - The Crescent and the Eagle, Ottoman Rule, Islam and the Albanians, 1874-1913. 
Gilkes, O. J., A. M. Liberati, L. Miraj, I. Pojani, F. Sear, J. Wilkes, and B. Polci – The Theatre at Butrint. Luigi Maria Ugolini’s Excavations at Butrint 1928-1932 (Albania Antica IV). 
Gordon, Jan and Cora J. Gordon – Two Vagabonds in Albania. 
Griffith, William E. – Albania and the Sino-Soviet Rift. 
Hall, Derek – Albania and the Albanians. 
Hasluck, Margaret and J. H. Hutton – The Unwritten Law in Albania. 
Hoffman, George W. – Regional Development Strategy in Southeast Europe: A Comparative Analysis of Albania, Bulgaria, Greece, Romania, and Yugoslavia. 
Hutchings, Raymond – Historical Dictionary of Albania. 
Hyman, Susan – Edward Lear in the Levant: Travels in Albania, Greece and Turkey in Europe, 1848-1849. 
Information Department of The Royal Institute of International Affairs – The Balkan States: 1. Economic. A Review of the Economic and Financial Development of Albania, Bulgaria, Greece, Roumania and Yugoslavia Since 1919. 
Knowlton, Mary Lee - Albania. 
Kola, Paulin – The Myth of Greater Albania. 
Kondis, Basil – Greece and Albania, 1908-1914. 
Kontos, Joan Fultz – Red Cross, Black Eagle: A Biography of Albania’s America School. 
Lloyd, A. L. – Folk Music of Albania. 
May, Jacques M. – The Ecology of Malnutrition in Five Countries of Eastern and Central Europe (East Germany, Poland, Yugoslavia, Albania, Greece). 
Murzaku, Inez A. - Catholicism, Culture, Conversion: The History of the Jesuits in Albania (1841-1946). 
Murzaku, Inez Angeli - Returning Home to Rome: The Basilian Monks of Grottaferrata in Albania. 
Myrdal, Jan and Gus Kessle - Albania Defiant. 
Newbigin, Marion I. – Southern Europe: A Regional and Economic Geography of the Mediterranean Lands (Italy, Spain, Portugal, Greece, Albania, and Switzerland). 
Pano, Nicholas C. – The People’s Republic of Albania. 
Pano, Nicholas C. – The Republic of Albania. 
Peacock, Wadham – Albania, the Founding State of Europe. 
Pettifer, James - Blue Guide Albania.
Pipa, Arshi and Sami Repishti, ed. - Studies on Kosova. 
Prifti, Peter - Socialist Albania since 1944. 
Sjoeberg, Oerjan – Rural Change and Development in Albania. 
Skendi, Stavro - Albania.
Szajcowski, Bogan – Marxist Governments: A World Survey: Vol. 1, Albania- The Congo; Vol. 2, Cuba-Mongolia; Vol. 3, Mozambique-Yugoslavia. 
Tarifa, Fatos and Max Spoor – The First Decade and After: Albania’s Democratic Transition and Consolidation in the Context of Southeast Europe. 
Thomas, John I. – Education and Communism: School and State in the People’s Republic of Albania. 
Vickers, Miranda and James Pettifer – Albania: From Anarchy to a Balkan Identity. 
Winnifrith, Tom - Perspectives on Albania. 
Young, Antonia - Albania.

Notes

Albania
Albanian studies